Daesa Station is a station of the BGLRT Line of Busan Metro in Gangdong-dong, Gangseo District, Busan, South Korea.

Station Layout

Vicinity
 Exit 1: Shinmart Gangdong-dong Branch
 Exit 2: Daesayeog

External links
  Cyber station information from Busan Transportation Corporation

Busan Metro stations
Busan–Gimhae Light Rail Transit
Gangseo District, Busan
Railway stations opened in 2011